Ilex magnifructa is a species of plant in the family Aquifoliaceae. It is endemic to Venezuela. It primarily grows in the wet tropical biome.

References

magnifructa
Endemic flora of Venezuela
Near threatened plants
Near threatened biota of South America
Taxonomy articles created by Polbot